Cephalantheropsis is a genus of orchids (family Orchidaceae), comprising 4 accepted species distributed in China, Japan, the Eastern Himalayas  and Southeast Asia.

Closely related to Calanthe and Phaius, recent phylogenetic analysis  indicates that this genus is in the tribe Collabieae (which also includes Spathoglottis and Acanthophippium) rather than in Bletiinae.

Species
Species currently accepted as of May 2014:

 Cephalantheropsis halconensis (Ames) S.S.Ying - Taiwan, Luzon
 Cephalantheropsis laciniata Ormerod - Peninsular Malaysia
 Cephalantheropsis longipes (Hook.f.) Ormerod - Guangxi, Taiwan, Tibet, Yunnan, Sikkim, Assam, Bhutan, Myanmar, Thailand, Vietnam, Malaysia, Sumatra, Philippines 
 Cephalantheropsis obcordata (Lindl.) Ormerod - Fujian, Guangdong, Hainan, Taiwan, Yunnan, Japan, Ryukyu Islands, Assam, Bangladesh, Laos, Myanmar, Vietnam, Malaysia, Maluku, Philippines

References

External links

Collabieae genera
Collabieae